The Czech Republic competed at the 2000 Summer Olympics in Sydney, Australia.

Medalists

Athletics 

Men
Track and road events

Field events

Combined events – Decathlon

Women
Track and road events

Field events

Boxing

Canoeing

Flatwater 

Men

Slalom

Cycling

Road
Men

Track

Time trial

Sprint

Pursuit

Keirin

Mountain biking

Diving

Football

Men

Roster
Head coach:  Karel Bruckner

Aleš Chvalovský
Lukáš Došek
Adam Petrouš
Radoslav Kováč
Roman Lengyel
Roman Týce
Libor Sionko
Tomáš Ujfaluši
Marek Jankulovski
Tomáš Kučera
Milan Baroš
Jan Polák
Erich Brabec
Libor Došek
Martin Vozábal
Jan Šimák
Marek Heinz
Jaroslav Drobný
Marcel Lička
Luděk Stracený
Martin Čupr
Petr Čech

Group play

Gymnastics 

 Jana Komrsková
 Katerina Maresova

Rowing

The Czech Republic had one rower participate in one of the fourteen events in 2000.

Sailing

Shooting 

Men

Women

Swimming 

Men

Women

Synchronized swimming

Triathlon

The Czech Republic captured one of the first Olympic triathlon medals when Jan Řehula passed ten other competitors during the final phase of the race to win the bronze medal. Two other Czech triathletes finished the race, while a fourth competitor withdrew during the cycling phase.

Volleyball

Beach

Weightlifting

References
Wallechinsky, David (2004). The Complete Book of the Summer Olympics (Athens 2004 Edition). Toronto, Canada. . 
International Olympic Committee (2001). The Results. Retrieved 12 November 2005.
Sydney Organising Committee for the Olympic Games (2001). Official Report of the XXVII Olympiad Volume 1: Preparing for the Games. Retrieved 20 November 2005.
Sydney Organising Committee for the Olympic Games (2001). Official Report of the XXVII Olympiad Volume 2: Celebrating the Games. Retrieved 20 November 2005.
Sydney Organising Committee for the Olympic Games (2001). The Results. Retrieved 20 November 2005.
International Olympic Committee Web Site
sports-reference

Specific

Nations at the 2000 Summer Olympics
2000 Summer Olympics
2000 in Czech sport